Laelia is a genus of orchids from Central and South America.

Laelia may also refer to:

Science
Laelia (moth), a genus of moths
Philhedra laelia (also known as Crania laelia and Petrocrania laelia), a species of extinct brachiopod in the Craniidae family
Laelia, a crater on the minor planet Vesta

History
Laelia (city), ancient Roman city in southern Hispania
Laelia (gens), a noble family from Ancient Rome
Laelia, a vestal virgin of Ancient Rome
Laelia Quinta, Roman noblewoman married to Lucius Subrius Felix of the Subria gens
Aelia Laelia Crispis, a famous tombstone in Bologna, Italy

See also
Aelia (disambiguation)